ECLR-attributed grammars are a special type of attribute grammars.

They are a variant of LR-attributed grammars where an equivalence relation on inherited attributes is used to optimize attribute evaluation. EC stands for equivalence class. Rie is based on ECLR-attributed grammars.

External links 
 http://www.is.titech.ac.jp/~sassa/lab/rie-e.html
 M. Sassa, H. Ishizuka and I. Nakata: ECLR-attributed grammars: a practical class of LR-attributed grammars. Inf. Process. Lett. 24 (1987), 31–41.
 M. Sassa, H. Ishizuka and I. Nakata: Rie, a Compiler Generator Based on a One-pass-type Attribute Grammar. Software—practice and experience 25:3 (March 1995), 229–250.

Formal languages
Compiler construction